Charlton Juan Vicento (born 19 January 1991) is a Curaçaoan footballer who plays as a winger for VV Oosterhout and the Curaçao national team.

Club career
Vicento made his Eredivisie debut for ADO Den Haag on 15 August 2009, starting in a match against FC Twente at the Den Haag Stadion. His first goal came on 24 October 2009, in a match against Sparta Rotterdam. Vicento made a total of 14 appearances in the Eredivisie for the 2009–10 season, scoring one goal.

International career

Youth
Vicento represented the Netherlands U-19 team in the qualification rounds for the 2010 UEFA European Under-19 Football Championship. On 14 November 2009, Vicento scored his first goal for the U-19 Oranje in a qualification match against Cyprus.

Senior
On 30 September 2014, Vicento received his first call ups to the Curaçao national team ahead of the second round of the 2014 Caribbean Cup qualifying series against Martinique, Guadeloupe and St. Vincent and the Grenadines contested on the island of Guadeloupe from 8 to 12 October 2014. He made his first appearance against Martinique on 8 October, scoring the equalizer in the closing minutes of the game.

Senior goals
Score and Result list Curaçao's goals tally first

|-
| 1. || 1 April 2015 || Blakes Estate Stadium, Look Out, Montserrat ||  ||  ||  || 2018 FIFA World Cup qualification ||
|-
| 2. || 6 June 2015 || Ergilio Hato Stadium, Willemstad, Curaçao ||  ||  ||  || Friendly ||
|}

Controversy
In March 2011, a video on YouTube showed what appeared to be Vicento bringing a Nazi salute to a celebrating crowd after ADO Den Haag defeated Ajax. Unlike head coach John van den Brom and teammate Lex Immers, Vicento received no penalties for his involvement in the controversial celebration.

Honours

Club
Willem II
Eerste Divisie: 2013–14

References

External links
 Caribbean Football Database profile 

1991 births
Living people
Dutch footballers
Dutch people of Curaçao descent
Curaçao footballers
Curaçao expatriate footballers
Curaçao international footballers
ADO Den Haag players
PAS Giannina F.C. players
Willem II (football club) players
Helmond Sport players
Kozakken Boys players
SteDoCo players
Eredivisie players
Eerste Divisie players
Tweede Divisie players
Derde Divisie players
Super League Greece players
Dutch expatriate footballers
Dutch expatriate sportspeople in Greece
Expatriate footballers in Greece
Footballers from Zoetermeer
Netherlands youth international footballers
Netherlands under-21 international footballers
2014 Caribbean Cup players
Association football wingers